Aisha Jamila Hinds is an American television, stage and film actress. She had supporting roles in a number of television series, including The Shield, Invasion, True Blood, Detroit 1-8-7 and Under the Dome. In 2016, she played Fannie Lou Hamer in biographical drama film All the Way. She has also appeared in Assault on Precinct 13 (2005) and was cast as Harriet Tubman in WGN America period drama Underground. Beginning in 2018, Hinds stars in the Fox procedural drama series 9-1-1.

Life and career
Hinds was born in New York, New York. She began her career on television in 2003, on NYPD Blue. In 2004, she had a recurring role on The Shield as Annie Price, and later guest-starred in Crossing Jordan, Boston Legal, It's Always Sunny in Philadelphia, Law & Order: Special Victims Unit, Stargate SG-1, Cold Case, and Desperate Housewives. Hinds was a series regular in the two short-lived ABC series Invasion from 2005 to 2006, and Detroit 1-8-7 (2010–2011). She had recurring roles on Dollhouse, HawthoRNe and True Blood. In film, Hinds appeared in Mr. Brooks, Madea Goes to Jail, Unstoppable, and Star Trek Into Darkness. On stage, she played the leading role of The Best of Enemies at George Street Playhouse in 2011.

In 2013, Hinds appeared on the CW series, Cult, as the evil Rosalind Sakelik. Right after Cult was canceled, Hinds was cast as a series regular on the CBS television series Under the Dome based on Stephen King's book of the same title. She was changed to recurring basis after the first season. In 2014, she had supporting roles in films If I Stay and Beyond the Lights. Also in that year, she had the recurring role of Chief Investigator Ava Wallace on the CBS police procedural, NCIS: Los Angeles. In 2015, Hinds was cast as a regular in the TNT drama pilot, Breed.

In 2016, Hinds received positive reviews for playing civil rights activist Fannie Lou Hamer in the HBO biographical drama film All the Way. Later she was cast in the Fox drama series Shots Fired, and in the WGN America period drama Underground, playing Harriet Tubman. She stars as paramedic Henrietta "Hen" Wilson on TV series 9-1-1 which focuses on Los Angeles first responders including 9-1-1 dispatchers, police officers and the firefighters and paramedics as they deal with not only saving lives but also with struggles in their own lives.

Filmography

Film

Television

Awards and nominations

References

External links

 
 

1975 births
21st-century American actresses
Actresses from New York City
American television actresses
American people of Grenadian descent
African-American actresses
American film actresses
Living people
People from Brooklyn
21st-century African-American women
21st-century African-American people
20th-century African-American people
20th-century African-American women